The 1993 Dwars door België was the 48th edition of the Dwars door Vlaanderen cycle race and was held on 24 March 1993. The race started and finished in Waregem. The race was won by Johan Museeuw.

General classification

References

1993
1993 in road cycling
1993 in Belgian sport
March 1993 sports events in Europe